Maksym Leshchenko (born 29 April 1993) is a Ukrainian professional footballer who plays as a defender for SC Chaika.

Player career
Leshchenko began his career at Dynamo-2 Kyiv in 2009 where he played two seasons, before moving to Kryvbas-2 Kryvyi Rih. Then he moved to Obolon Kyiv for two seasons where he played 30 games. Obolon Kyiv. In 2014 he moved to Mykolaiv for two seasons playing 19 matches and scoring 1 goal. In December 2015 he moved to Desna Chernihiv  in the city of Chernihiv, playing only 6 games, before moving to Poltava playimg 11 games. In December 2016 he moved to Krymteplytsia Molodizhne in Crimea where he played 26 games scoring 1 goal. In 2018 he played 2 games with Kobra Kharkiv and 8 with Polissya Zhytomyr. In 2019 moved to SC Chaika team playing in the Ukrainian Second League.

Honours
Desna Chernihiv
 Ukrainian First League: Runners-up 2016–17

References

External links
 
 Leshchenko Maksym Serhiiovych at upl.ua 

1993 births
Living people
Footballers from Chernihiv
FC Dynamo-2 Kyiv players
FC Kryvbas-2 Kryvyi Rih players
FC Obolon-Brovar Kyiv players
MFC Mykolaiv players
FC Desna Chernihiv players
FC Poltava players
FC Krymteplytsia Molodizhne players
FC Helios Kharkiv players
FC Polissya Zhytomyr players
SC Chaika Petropavlivska Borshchahivka players
Ukrainian footballers
Association football central defenders
Ukrainian First League players